
This is a list of the 37 players who earned their 2012 European Tour card through Q School in 2011.

 2012 European Tour rookie

2012 Results

* European Tour rookie in 2012
T = Tied 
 The player retained his European Tour card for 2013 (finished inside the top 118).
 The player did not retain his European Tour Tour card for 2013, but retained conditional status (finished between 119-155).
 The player did not retain his European Tour card for 2013 (finished outside the top 155).

Sullivan, Orr, Lagergren, Nixon, Lundberg, and Southgate regained their cards for 2013 through Q School.

Winners on the European Tour in 2012

Runners-up on the European Tour in 2012

See also
2011 Challenge Tour graduates
2012 European Tour

References
Final results
Player biographies and records

European Tour
European Tour Qualifying School Graduates